Natasha Elvina Hamilton-Hart is a New Zealand business academic. She is currently a full professor at the University of Auckland.

Academic career

After a 1999 PhD titled  'States and capital mobility : Indonesia, Malaysia and Singapore in the Asian region'  at the Cornell University, she moved to the University of Auckland, rising to full professor.

Selected works 
 Hamilton-Hart, Natasha. Asian states, Asian bankers: central banking in Southeast Asia. Cornell University Press, 2002.
 Hamilton-Hart, Natasha. "The Singapore state revisited." The Pacific Review 13, no. 2 (2000): 195–216.
 Hamilton-Hart, Natasha. "Anti-corruption strategies in Indonesia." Bulletin of Indonesian Economic Studies 37, no. 1 (2001): 65–82.
 Hamilton-Hart, Natasha. "Terrorism in Southeast Asia: expert analysis, myopia and fantasy." The Pacific Review 18, no. 3 (2005): 303–325.

References

External links
  
 

Living people
New Zealand women academics
Cornell University alumni
Academic staff of the University of Auckland
1969 births
New Zealand women writers